Podalia is a genus of moths in the family Megalopygidae.

Species
Podalia albescens (Schaus, 1900)
Podalia amarga (Schaus, 1905)
Podalia angulata (Hopp, 1922)
Podalia annulipes (Boisduval, 1833)
Podalia bolivari Heylaerts, 1884
Podalia cincinnata (Dognin, 1922)
Podalia contigua (Walker, 1866)
Podalia dimidiata (Herrich-Schäffer, 1856)
Podalia dyari (Joicey & Talbot)
Podalia fuscescens Walker, 1856
Podalia gamelia (Druce, 1904)
Podalia guaya (Schaus, 1927)
Podalia habitus (H. Edwards, 1887)
Podalia intermaculata Dognin, 1916
Podalia lanocrispa E. D. Jones, 1912
Podalia mallas (Druce, 1899)
Podalia marmorata (Rothschild, 1910)
Podalia nivosa E. D. Jones, 1912
Podalia orsilochus (Cramer, 1775)
Podalia pedacia (Druce, 1906)
Podalia pellucens Dognin
Podalia pedacioides Dognin, 1916
Podalia prolecta (Hopp, 1935)
Podalia pseudopedacia Dognin, 1916
Podalia schadei Schaus, 1924
Podalia thanatos Schaus, 1905
Podalia tympania (Druce, 1897)
Podalia walkerensis Hopp, 1935
Podalia walkeri (Berg, 1882)

References

Megalopygidae
Megalopygidae genera